Alex Craig Lange (born October 2, 1995) is an American professional baseball pitcher for the Detroit Tigers of Major League baseball (MLB). He played college baseball at Louisiana State University (LSU). He was drafted by the Chicago Cubs with the 30th pick in the first round of the 2017 Major League Baseball draft.

Career
Lange was adopted when he was a baby. He attended Lee's Summit West High School in Lee's Summit, Missouri and maintained a 4.0 weighted GPA. As a senior, Lange was named the Missouri Gatorade Baseball Player of the Year (2014). He was scouted by many NCAA Division I colleges, but chose to attend Louisiana State University (LSU).
 
As a college freshman in 2015, Lange was a consensus All-American. He was also named the National Freshman Pitcher of the Year by Louisville Slugger and the National Collegiate Baseball Writers Association and helped lead LSU to the College World Series. LSU returned to the College World Series in 2017, and facing top-ranked Oregon State in his first College World Series start, Lange pitched seven innings and allowed only two hits to lead LSU to victory.

Chicago Cubs
The Chicago Cubs selected Lange with the 30th pick in the first round of the 2017 MLB Draft. He signed with the Cubs and was assigned to the Eugene Emeralds of the Class A-Short Season Northwest League, where he posted an 0–1 win–loss record with a 4.82 earned run average (ERA) in  innings pitched. MLB.com ranked Lange as Chicago's fifth best prospect going into the 2018 season. He spent the 2018 season with the Myrtle Beach Pelicans of the Class A-Advanced Carolina League, going 6-8 with a 3.74 ERA in 23 starts. Lange began 2019 back with Myrtle Beach.

Detroit Tigers
On July 31, 2019, the Cubs traded Lange and Paul Richan to the Detroit Tigers in exchange for Nicholas Castellanos. He was assigned to the Erie SeaWolves. Over 27 games (18 starts) between Myrtle Beach and Erie, he went 5–13 with a 5.45 ERA, striking out 94 batters over  innings. He was selected to play in the Arizona Fall League for the Mesa Solar Sox following the season. The Tigers added Lange to their 40-man roster after the 2020 season.

On April 10, 2021, Lange was promoted to the majors for the first time and made his Major League debut that day, throwing a scoreless inning. On September 20, 2021, Lange recorded his first career save with a perfect 1-2-3 ninth inning against the Chicago White Sox. He earned his first major league win on September 30 with  innings of scoreless relief against the Minnesota Twins. Overall, Lange made 36 appearances for the 2021 Tigers, posting a 1–3 record and 4.04 ERA, while striking out 39 batters in  innings.

In 2022, Lange primarily filled a middle relief and setup role. He led the Tigers with 71 appearances, posting a 7–4 record and a 3.69 ERA, with 82 strikeouts in  innings.

References

External links

LSU Tigers bio

1995 births
Living people
People from Lee's Summit, Missouri
Baseball players from Missouri
Major League Baseball pitchers
All-American college baseball players
Detroit Tigers players
LSU Tigers baseball players
Eugene Emeralds players
Myrtle Beach Pelicans players
Tennessee Smokies players
Erie SeaWolves players
Mesa Solar Sox players